Point Pedro Lighthouse is a lighthouse in Point Pedro in northern Sri Lanka. Built in 1916, the  white lighthouse has a round masonry tower with lantern and gallery. The lighthouse is dwarfed by a vast communication tower for the Sri Lanka Navy.

See also

 List of lighthouses in Sri Lanka

References

External links
 Sri Lanka Ports Authority 
 Lighthouses of Sri Lanka

Buildings and structures in Point Pedro
Lighthouses completed in 1916
Lighthouses in Sri Lanka